Miracle Pill is the twelfth studio album by American rock band Goo Goo Dolls. The album was released on September 13, 2019, by Warner Records.

Recording
Songwriter and fan Valerie Broussard contributed vocals to "Money, Fame & Fortune".  The album's first single "Miracle Pill" was released on June 21, 2019. The music video for "Miracle Pill" was released on July 16, 2019. The album's second single "Money, Fame & Fortune" was released on July 19, 2019. The album's third single "Indestructible" was released on August 9, 2019.

Track listing

Personnel
Credits for Miracle Pill adapted from Tidal.

Goo Goo Dolls
 John Rzeznik - vocals (1-4, 6-8, 10-11), guitar (1-2, 4-11)
 Robby Takac - vocals (5, 9), bass (1-2, 4-11), bass guitar (3)

Additional musicians
 Aaron Patrick - background vocals (1)
 Derek Fuhrmann - background vocals (2, 4-6, 8-9), guitar (2, 4-6, 8), additional guitar (9)
 Jim McGorman - background vocals (2, 4-11), keyboards (2, 4-10), organ (10)
 Kenna Ramsey - background vocals (2, 7-8)
 Oren Waters - background vocals (2, 7-8)
 Táta Vega - background vocals (2, 7-8)
 Maiya Sykes - background vocals (3)
 Sylvia Mac Calla - background vocals (7)
 Terry Young - background vocals (7)
 Valerie Broussard - vocals (4)
 Brad Fernquist - guitar (all tracks)
 Aaron Sterling - drums (1, 3)
 Josh Freese - drums (2, 4-11)
 Jacob Braun - cello (7)
 David Low - cello (11)
 Thomas Lea - viola (7)
 Corinne Sobolewski - viola (11)
 Charlie Bisharat - violin (7)
 Joel Derouin - violin (7)
 Gunnar Olsen - percussion (11)
 Brian Lawlor - piano (11)

Technical
 Grant Michaels - production (1, 3)
 Sam Hollander - production (1, 3)
 Drew Pearson - production (7, 10)
 Derek Fuhrmann - production (2, 4-6, 8-9)
 Alex Aidi - production (11)
 Claudius Mittendorfer - mixing (1, 3)
 Adam Hawkins - mixing (2, 4-9, 11)
 Dave Trumfio - engineering (1, 3)
 Josh Edmonson - engineering (1, 3)
 Chris Szczech - engineering (2, 4-11), recording (all tracks)
 Brad Lauchert - engineering (5, 9), programming (5), recording (5)
 Celso Estrada - assistant engineering (1, 3)
 Tim Keen - assistant engineering (1, 3)
 Nick Rives - assistant engineering (4-11)
 Alex Poeppel - recording (11)
 Billy Perez - recording (11)
 Chris Gehringer - mastering
 Will Quinnell - assistant

Artwork
 Alex Tenta - design, layout
 Dan Cooper - photography
 Ed Gregory - photography

Charts

References

2019 albums
Goo Goo Dolls albums
Warner Records albums